Edinburg High School (EHS) is a comprehensive public high school in Murillo (formerly Nurillo), a census-designated place in Hidalgo County, Texas, east of Edinburg. It is operated by the Edinburg Consolidated Independent School District along with Edinburg North High School, Robert Vela High School, and Johnny G. Economedes High School. It has enrolled 2,927 students  and 175 staff, with 35% holding advanced degrees; its enrollment is 95% Hispanic, 4% White, and 1% Asian/Pacific Islander.

A performing arts complex was built at Edinburg in 2010, during which time similar facilities were built at the other high schools.

Edinburg serves sections of southeastern Edinburg along with several census-designated places: Murillo, San Carlos, and a portion of Lopezville.

Notable alumni
David V. Aguilar, Former Chief of the United States Border Patrol
Gloria E. Anzaldúa, American scholar, author, poet and activist
Cathy Baker, Actress, painter
Alfredo Cantu Gonzalez, Recipient the Medal of Honor 
J.E. "Eddie" Guerra, Sheriff of Hidalgo County
Jim Wright, American football player and coach

Emmanuel Duron Incident
In December 2020, the school received national attention after Emmanuel Duron, a defensive lineman on the football team who had been named District 31-6A defensive player of the year in 2019, attacked referee Fred Garcia during the first half of the zone play-in playoff game against Pharr-San Juan-Alamo High School. Duron was ejected from the game for two unsportsmanlike penalties when he attacked Garcia and left him with a concussion; he was escorted off the field and out of the stadium by police and was charged with Class A assault and was released from county jail after posting a $10,000 bail. Edinburg would win the game 35–21, but was disqualified from the playoffs the following day due to Duron's actions. The Edinburgh High School athletic program was also placed on probation for two years through the 2022-23 season.

References

External links
 

Edinburg Consolidated Independent School District high schools
Education in Edinburg, Texas
Buildings and structures in Edinburg, Texas